The 12th Academy Awards ceremony, held on February 29, 1940 by the Academy of Motion Picture Arts and Sciences (AMPAS), honored the best in film for 1939 at a banquet in the Coconut Grove at The Ambassador Hotel in Los Angeles. It was hosted by Bob Hope, in his first of nineteen turns as host. 

David O. Selznick's Gone with the Wind received the most nominations of the year with thirteen, winning eight Oscars (both records at the time). This year was the first in which multiple films received ten or more nominations (Mr. Smith Goes to Washington received eleven).

This was the first year in which Best Visual Effects was a competitive category; previously, "special achievement" awards for effects had occasionally been conferred. This year, Best Cinematography was split into Color and Black & White categories.

Hattie McDaniel became the first African-American to receive an Academy Award, winning Best Supporting Actress for Gone with the Wind. Mickey Rooney became the second-youngest nominee for Best Actor at 19, and the first teenager to be nominated for an Academy Award, for his performance in Babes in Arms.

Winners and nominees 

Nominees were announced on February 11, 1940. AMPAS presented Academy Awards of Merit in 20 categories. Nominees for each award are listed below; award winners are listed first and highlighted in boldface.

Academy Honorary Awards 

Academy Honorary Awards were presented to:

 Douglas Fairbanks "recognizing the unique and outstanding contribution of Douglas Fairbanks, first President of the Academy, to the international development of the motion picture".
 Motion Picture Relief Fund "acknowledging the outstanding services to the industry during the past year of the Motion Picture Relief Fund and its progressive leadership". Presented to Jean Hersholt, President; Ralph Morgan, Chairman of the executive committee; Ralph Block, First Vice-President; and Conrad Nagel. 
 William Cameron Menzies "for outstanding achievement in the use of color for the enhancement of dramatic mood in the production of Gone with the Wind".
 The Technicolor Company "for its contributions in successfully bringing three-color feature production to the screen".

Irving G. Thalberg Memorial Award 

The Irving G. Thalberg Memorial Award was presented to David O. Selznick.

Academy Juvenile Award 
The Academy Juvenile Award was presented to Judy Garland for The Wizard of Oz.

Multiple nominations and awards 

The following nineteen films received multiple nominations:
 13 nominations: Gone with the Wind
 11 nominations: Mr. Smith Goes to Washington
 8 nominations: Wuthering Heights
 7 nominations: Goodbye, Mr. Chips and Stagecoach
 6 nominations: Love Affair, The Rains Came and The Wizard of Oz
 5 nominations: The Private Lives of Elizabeth and Essex
 4 nominations: Ninotchka and Of Mice and Men
 3 nominations: Dark Victory and Man of Conquest
 2 nominations: Babes in Arms, Beau Geste, First Love, The Great Victor Herbert, Gulliver's Travels, and The Hunchback of Notre Dame

The following three films received multiple awards:
 8 awards: Gone with the Wind
 2 awards: Stagecoach and The Wizard of Oz

The lead-up to the awards ceremony 

Prior to the announcement of nominations, Mr. Smith Goes to Washington and Gone with the Wind were the two films most widely tipped to receive a significant number of nominations. Mr. Smith Goes to Washington premiered in Washington with a premier party hosted by the National Press Club who found themselves portrayed unfavourably in the film; the film's theme of political corruption was condemned and the film was denounced in the U.S. Senate. Joseph P. Kennedy, the U.S. Ambassador to Britain urged President Franklin D. Roosevelt and the studio head Harry Cohn to cease showing the film overseas because "it will cause our allies to view us in an unfavourable light". Among those who campaigned in favour of the film were Hedda Hopper who declared it "as great as Lincoln's Gettysburg speech", while Sheilah Graham called it the "best talking picture ever made". Screen Book magazine stated that it "should win every Academy Award". Frank Capra, the director, and James Stewart, the film's star were considered front runners to win awards.

Gone with the Wind premiered in December 1939 with a Gallup poll taken shortly before its release concluding that 56.5 million people intended to see the film. The New York Film Critics Award was given to Wuthering Heights after thirteen rounds of balloting had left the voters deadlocked between Mr. Smith Goes to Washington and Gone with the Wind. The press were divided in their support for the nominated actors. Time magazine favoured Vivien Leigh and used her portrait for their Christmas 1939 edition, and The Hollywood Reporter predicted a possible win by Leigh and Laurence Olivier with the comment that they "are, for the moment, just about the most sacred of all Hollywood's sacred cows". West Coast newspapers, particularly in Los Angeles, predicted Bette Davis would win for Dark Victory. Observing that Davis had achieved four box office successes during the year, one paper wrote, "Hollywood will stick by its favourite home-town girl, Bette Davis".

Ceremony 

Capra was the incumbent President of the Academy, and in a first for Academy Awards ceremonies, sold the rights for the event to be filmed. Warner Bros. obtained the rights, for $30,000 to film the banquet and the presentation of the awards, to use as a short, and it was shot by the cinematographer Charles Rosher. Variety noted the stars in attendance were conscious of being filmed at the event for the first time and the event was marked by glamour with fashion-conscious actresses wearing the best of gowns, furs and jewellery.

The Los Angeles Times printed a substantially accurate list of winners, despite a promise to withhold the results of the voting, so many of the nominees learned before arriving at the ceremony who had won. Among these were Clark Gable and Bette Davis.

Following the banquet, Capra opened proceedings at 11pm with a short speech before introducing Bob Hope who made his first appearance as host of the awards. Looking at a table laden with awards awaiting presentation, he quipped, "I feel like I'm in Bette Davis' living room". Mickey Rooney presented an Academy Juvenile Award to Judy Garland, who then performed "Over the Rainbow", a "Best Song" nominee from The Wizard of Oz.

As the evening progressed, Gone with the Wind won the majority of awards, and Bob Hope remarked to David O. Selznick, "David, you should have brought roller skates". Making a speech, Selznick paused to extend praise and gratitude to Olivia de Havilland, a "Best Supporting Actress" nominee, and made it clear in his speech he knew she had not won. Fay Bainter presented the awards for Best Supporting Actor and Actress, prefacing her presentation of the latter award with the knowing comment, "It is a tribute to a country where people are free to honor noteworthy achievements regardless of creed, race or color". Hattie McDaniel became the first black performer to win an Academy Award and in expressing her gratitude promised to be "a credit to my race" before bursting into tears. De Havilland was among those to make their way to McDaniel's table to offer congratulations, though it was reported de Havilland then fled to the kitchen, where she burst into tears. The press reported an irritated Irene Mayer Selznick followed her, and told her to return to their table and stop making a fool of herself.

Robert Donat, the winner for "Best Actor", was one of three nominated actors not present (the others were Irene Dunne and Greta Garbo). Accepting the award for Donat, Spencer Tracy said he was sure Donat's win was welcomed by "the entire motion-picture industry" before presenting the "Best Actress" award to Vivien Leigh. The press noted Bette Davis was among those waiting to congratulate Leigh as she returned to her table.

Post-awards discussion 

Further controversy erupted following the ceremony, with the Los Angeles Times reporting that Leigh had won over Davis by the smallest of margins and that Donat had likewise won over James Stewart by a small number of votes. This led Academy officials to examine ways that the voting process, and more importantly, the results, would remain secret in future years. They considered the Los Angeles Times publication of such details as a breach of faith.

Hattie McDaniel received considerable attention from the press with Daily Variety writing, "Not only was she the first of her race to receive an Award, but she was also the first Negro ever to sit at an Academy banquet".

Carole Lombard was quoted as comforting Gable after his loss, with the comment "Don't worry, Pappy. We'll bring one home next year". Gable replied that he felt this had been his last chance to which Lombard was said to have replied, "Not you, you self-centered bastard. I meant me."

Academy Award ceremony presenters 

The ceremony presenters are listed below in the sequence of awards presented.

See also 

 1939 in film
List of oldest and youngest Academy Award winners and nominees

References 

Academy Awards ceremonies
1939 film awards
1940 in Los Angeles
1940 in American cinema
February 1940 events